Bruce Hayes may refer to:

Bruce Hayes (linguist) (born 1955), professor of linguistics
Bruce Hayes (swimmer) (born 1963), American swimmer

See also
Bruce Hay (1950–2007), rugby player